Pephrica is a genus of beetles in the family Carabidae, containing the following species:

 Pephrica aequatoria (Fairmaire, 1868)
 Pephrica africana Mateu, 1963
 Pephrica howa (Csiki, 1932)
 Pephrica longefasciata Basilewsky, 1953
 Pephrica picea Basilewsky, 1953
 Pephrica trimaculata Alluaud, 1936

References

Lebiinae